The China Center of Adoption Affairs (CCAA) was established on June 24, 1996 by China's Ministry of Civil Affairs. The CCAA is responsible for the welfare of children in the care of Child Welfare Institutes (orphanages), domestic adoption, and international adoption.

Administrative structure 
Located in Beijing, the CCAA has one office that is divided into the following eight departments with specific administrative responsibilities: Administrative Office; Adopter’s Eligibility Review Department; Child’s Inter-Country Placement Department; Domestic Adoption Department; Child-Raising Department; Archives Management Department; Information and Technology Department; Finance Department; and General Affairs Department.

Nurture of children in Social Welfare Institutions 
The CCAA has announced four concrete missions with regard to its role in overseeing the welfare of children in social welfare institutions.  The first mission is to conduct studies and make recommendations concerning child-raising programs in such institutions.  Second, the CCAA aims to promulgate standards to be implemented in social welfare institutions.  The third mission is to manage the training of care-providers.  Fourth, the CCAA seeks to implement advanced methods and programs in child-rearing.

Domestic adoptions 
The CCAA also has four missions with regard to the handling of domestic adoptions.  First, the CCAA is to conduct studies aimed at furthering the development of its domestic adoption program.  The second mission is to develop and implement regulations for domestic adoption.  The third mission is to develop a consulting service for the program, and the fourth mission is to coordinate and develop an inter-province domestic adoption service.

Intercountry adoptions 
China ratified the Hague Convention on Protection of Children and Co-operation in Respect of Intercountry Adoption on September 16, 2005.  Pursuant to Article 6 of the convention, the CCAA is the Central Authority responsible for all inter-country adoptions in China.  As such, the CCAA has the overall responsibility for the inter-country adoption of Chinese children.  Chinese law governs the adoptability of Chinese children, regardless of the country where potential adopters reside.  Pursuant to Article 4 of the Adoption Law of the People's Republic of China (Adoption Law), the following children under the age of 14 qualify for adoption: orphans; children who have been abandoned by their parents; and children whose parents are unable to care for them due to “unusual difficulties.”

Adoptions must be fully completed in China, as it is not possible under Chinese law to obtain guardianship over a child for later adoption in a foreign country.  Adoptive parents must travel to China to finalize the adoption of a child.  In the event only one parent is able to travel to China to finalize the adoption, the spouse who travels to China must bring a notarized power of attorney for the other spouse.

Eight missions of the CCAA 
The CCAA claims to have eight concrete missions with regard to intercountry adoptions.  First, the CCAA receives and reviews applications and certifying documentation from foreign persons wishing to adopt.  Second, the CCAA also receives certifying documentation from persons placing children out for adoption.  Pursuant to Article 5 of the Adoption Law, the following individuals are entitled to place children out for adoption: guardians of an orphan; social welfare institutions; and parents who are unable to care for their children.  The third mission of the CCAA is to locate and assign children who are available for adoption under the Adoption Law.  Fourth, the CCAA is to follow up with the life and growth of adopted children in foreign countries.  The CCAA’s fifth mission is to assist other departments of the Chinese government that are involved in the adoption of Chinese children.  Such departments include Child Welfare Institutes, provincial Notarial Offices responsible for issuance of the final adoption certificate, and the Public Security Bureau responsible for issuing Chinese passports and exit permits for adopted children.  The sixth mission is to archive all documentation for each party involved in a child’s adoption, including the application for adoption, certifying documents, and materials concerning the life of the child in his or her new home.  Seventh, the CCAA is to conduct any liaison, counseling, or coordination work involved with inter-country adoptions.  The final stated mission of the CCAA is to handle any other matters regarding the intercountry adoption process that has not been delegated to another office or authority.

Required documentation 
The CCAA requires prospective adopters to submit the following application documents: adoption application; birth certificate; marital status certificate; certificates of profession, property and income; health examination certificate; home study report; certificate of child adoption approval by the competent department of the prospective adopters’ country of residence; copy of applicants’ passports; and two full-face photographs of each adopter, as well as several other photographs reflecting the family’s life in their home country.

In addition to the application documents, prospective adopters are also required to submit the following certifying documentation: notarized medical certificate completed by a physician for each prospective adopter; notarized medical certificate of infertility if applicable to the prospective adoptive couple; a certificate of good conduct from a local or national law enforcement department, which needs to either be notarized or bear the department’s official seal; notarized and authenticated verification of employment and salary; two notarized and authenticated letters of reference; a certified home study prepared by a CCAA-licensed adoption agency; notarized and authenticated bank statements; notarized and authenticated power of attorney if only one spouse travels to China to finalize the adoption; family letter of intent to adopt; and copies of any forms required by the prospective adopters’ home countries.

All materials submitted to the CCAA must have a certified Mandarin Chinese translation, and the material must include a notarized statement by the translator attesting to the validity of the translation.  The CCAA will have the documents translated for a $200 (U.S.) fee.

Adoption process 
The U.S. Department of State has outlined the following procedures for intercountry adoption of Chinese children.  The process starts when a CCAA-licensed adoption agency sends a complete application packet, including all required documentation, directly to the CCAA.  In addition to all documentation required by the CCAA, the application packet should include a cover letter and any preferences with regard to the child’s age, sex, physical/mental condition, or Chinese region of origin.  Once received, the CCAA reviews the application packet and requests that the prospective adopters submit any omitted documents or authorizations.

If the CCAA approves the application, it will then match an available child with the prospective adopters and will send the prospective adopters information about the child, commonly called a “referral,” which includes photographs and the child’s health records.  If the prospective adopters have additional questions after receiving the information, they may contact the CCAA either directly or through their adoption agency.

Within 45 days after the CCAA sent the referral, the prospective adopters must notify the CCAA, via their adoption agency, whether or not they have chosen to accept the referral.  If the prospective adopters reject the referral, they must provide a justified explanation to the CCAA; otherwise, the CCAA may withdraw their application for Chinese adoption.  If the prospective parents accept a referral, the CCAA will send them an approval notice (Notice of Coming to China for Adoption).

After the prospective adopters receive the approval notice form the CCAA, they may then travel to China to finalize the adoption process.  Although the CCAA is located in Beijing, prospective adopters will not be required to travel to Beijing during the adoption process.  Instead, the location of the child to be adopted determines which city the prospective adopters travel to.  Prior to the arrival of the prospective adopters, the CCAA will have forwarded a copy of the adoption approval notice to the Child Welfare Institutes, the Civil Affairs officials, and the Notarial Offices in the locality where the child to be adopted resides.

In order to finalize the adoption, the prospective adopters must first meet with the adoption registry office.  Prospective adopters are sometimes required to meet with the local Notarial Office as well.  Prior to the completion of the adoption, the prospective adopters may request to see the child in person.  Any additional questions about the child must be resolved prior to finalization of the adoption.

After interviewing with the various Chinese government offices, the prospective adopters must pay a fixed donation of between $3000 to $5000 (U.S.) to the Child Welfare Institute where the child was cared for prior to the adoption.  The prospective adopters will then be required to sign agreements with the Child Welfare Institute, register the adoption at the provincial Civil Affairs Bureau, and pay all of the remaining required fees.

After the local Notarial Office approves the adoption, that Office will notarize a certificate of adoption, a birth certificate, and either a death certificate for the child’s biological parents or a statement of abandonment from the Welfare Institute.  The child is officially adopted on the day of the notarization, after which the adopters are fully and legally responsible for the child.

Once the adoption has been finalized, the Child Welfare Institute must obtain a Chinese passport and exit permit from the Public Security Bureau in that jurisdiction.

Revised intercountry adoption requirements 
The CCAA has promulgated the following new intercountry adoption requirements, set to take effect on May 1, 2007.
Prospective adopters must be married for at least two years prior to the adoption, with marriage defined as being between a man and a woman.  If either the husband or wife has been divorced in the past, the prospective adopters must be married for at least five years prior to the adoption.  If either the husband or wife has been divorced more than twice, the couple is precluded from adopting a Chinese child.
Single persons will no longer be eligible to adopt Chinese children, although they were previously allowed to by the CCAA.  In fact, approximately one-third of all children adopted from China in the past were adopted by single parents.  This restriction is due, in part, to the belief that the child will be without a parent if the single adopter dies.  Chinese law has always precluded homosexual individuals or couples from adopting children.
Both the husband and wife must be at least 30 years of age, and both must be under the age of 50.  If a couple is adopting a special needs child, neither spouse can be older than 55 years of age.
The age restriction is meant to lessen the chances that a child will lose a parent before turning 18 years of age, or that a child will be burdened with the responsibility of providing for elderly parents.
Both the husband and wife must be physically and mentally fit, and must not have any of the following conditions:
AIDS;
Mental handicap;
Infectious disease that is actively contagious;
Blindness in one or both eyes or wearing an ocular prosthetic;
Hearing impairment in both ears or the loss of language function; those adopting children with hearing or language function loss are exempt if they have the same conditions;
Non-function or dysfunction of limbs or trunk caused by impairment, incomplete limb, paralysis or deformation;
Severe facial deformation;
Severe diseases that require long-term treatment and that affect life expectancy, including malignant tumors, lupus erythematosus, nephrosis, epilepsy, etc.;
Major organ transplant within the past ten years;
Schizophrenia;
On medication for more than two years for severe mental disorders, such as clinical depression, mania, or anxiety disorder;
Body mass index (BMI) greater than 40.
One spouse must have stable employment.  The family’s annual income must be $10,000 per household member (including children), and the family’s assets must total at least $80,000.  The requisite family income excludes welfare income, pensions, unemployment insurance, government subsidies, etc.;
Each spouse must be a high school graduate, or have vocational training equivalent to that of a high school graduate;
A couple must have fewer than five children in the family under 18 years of age, and the youngest child should be at least 1 year of age.  Families adopting special needs children will be exempt.
Neither spouse may have a criminal record, as well as any of the following histories:
Domestic violence, sex abuse, child abandonment or child abuse (even absent an arrest or conviction for such behavior);
Use of narcotics, like opium, morphine, marijuana, cocaine, heroin, methamphetamine, etc., or any medication for mental illness that has addictive qualities;
Alcohol abuse.  If prospective adopters do have histories of alcohol abuse, they must show that they have been sober for at least ten years.
Prospective adopters must understand the responsibilities of adoption, the expectation to provide a warm family environment for the orphaned child, and must be able to provide for the proper development of the child.  Prospective adopters must also have an understanding of intercountry adoption, and must be prepared for potential risks associated with intercountry adoption, such as potential diseases, developmental delays, post-placement maladjustment, etc.;
In their adoption application letter, the prospective adopters must clearly indicate that they are willing to allow post-placement follow-ups and to provide post-placement reports as required by the CCAA;
The fixed number of years or age requirements that prospective adopters must meet, as will be indicated in their adoption application letter, shall be dated from the day when the adoption application documents are logged in at the CCAA.

The new CCAA requirements are in response to an increase of adoption applications that have been submitted by prospective adopters.  The requirements are also due, in part, to a decrease in the number of available children for adoption.  The decrease in available children has been attributed to increased wealth of Chinese citizens, such that they are able to pay the “social compensation fee” to have more than one child under China’s one-child policy.

The CCAA claims that the rationale for the new requirements is to protect the best interests of children, as well as to shorten the waiting time for the most qualified applicants.

In the case of single applicants: Only single women may apply. The minimum age for single applicants is 30 at the time of application. There can be no more than 45 years difference between the child and applicant. There can be no more than two children under the age of 18 in the home and the youngest child must be older than 5 at the time of application. The minimum net worth of single applicants is $100,000 with an annual income of $10,000 per family member (including the prospective adoptee), plus an additional $10,000. There are additional requirements for single females who live with a male partner. Contact the China program for more information.  This is from the Holt International China adoption page Aug. 2016

Adoption to the United States
The United States is ranked as the number one destination for children adopted abroad, and since 2000, U.S. residents have adopted more children from China than any other country.

China first allowed adoptions to the United States in 1991, when 61 children were issued immigrant visas.  Between 1991 and 2005, the number of American adoptions of Chinese children had increased tremendously, with a total of 62,906 children have been adopted by U.S. residents during that time.  However, in recent years, largely as a result of adoption scandals, the number of American adoptions of Chinese children declined from a high of 7,906, in 2005, to 2,587, in 2011.  According to U.S. State Department statistics, the number of immigrant visas issued to Chinese orphans per year is as follows:
FY 2013: 2,306
FY 2012: 2,696
FY 2011: 2,587
FY 2010: 3,401
FY 2009: 3,000
FY 2008: 3,909
FY 2007: 5,453
FY 2006: 6,493
FY 2005: 7,906
FY 2004: 7,044
FY 2003: 6,859
FY 2002: 6,119
FY 2001: 4,681
FY 2000: 5,053
FY 1999: 4,101
FY 1998: 4,206
FY 1997: 3,597
FY 1996: 3,333
FY 1995: 2,130
FY 1994: 787
FY 1993: 330
FY 1992: 206
FY 1991: 61

Adoption to other countries
As of September 30, 2005, China has agreements with the following 16 nations for inter-country adoption: United States, Canada, United Kingdom, France, Spain, the Netherlands, Belgium, Denmark, Norway, Sweden, Finland, Iceland, Ireland, Australia, New Zealand, and Singapore.

After the United States, Spain is the country that adopts the most children from China.  In 2005, over 2,700 children were adopted by Spanish families. Like the United States, families in Australia, Canada, and Spain adopt more children from China than from any other country.

See also
 One-child policy

References

External links
 

Adoption-related organizations
Government agencies of China
Adoption law
Child-related organizations in China
Adoption in China